Petersburg National Battlefield is a National Park Service unit preserving sites related to the American Civil War Siege of Petersburg (1864–65).  The Battlefield is centered on the city of Petersburg, Virginia, and also includes outlying components in Hopewell, Prince George County, and Dinwiddie County. Over 140,000 people visit the park annually.

Park Units
Petersburg National Battlefield is composed of three major units and an additional managed component.

Eastern Front Visitor Center and Park Tour Road
Located off Virginia Route 36 east of Petersburg, the Eastern Front Visitor Center is the main visitor contact station for the Battlefield.  Here, visitors can view exhibits and movies about the Siege of Petersburg as well as view Battery #5, an important early site in the Siege.  There is no park entrance fee.

After leaving the Visitor Center, one can begin their park tour.  A motor tour route runs from Virginia Route 36 to US Route 301.  Along the way, visitors can view sites such as Fort Stedman and The Crater.

Five Forks Battlefield

Sometimes called the "Waterloo of the Confederacy," Five Forks helped set in motion a series of events that led to Robert E. Lee's subsequent surrender at Appomattox Court House.

City Point Unit

Sited next to the James River in Hopewell, City Point served as a major command and logistics hub for the Union Army during the Siege of Petersburg.  It is located in the City Point Historic District.

Poplar Grove National Cemetery
The  Poplar Grove National Cemetery is administered by Petersburg National Battlefield.

History

 Established as Petersburg National Military Park on 1926-07-03.
 Transferred from the War Department on 1933-08-10.
 Redesignated as Petersburg National Battlefield on 1962-08-24.
 Added to the National Register of Historic Places on 1966-10-15.

See also
Richmond National Battlefield Park, administering areas related to the Siege of Petersburg which are north of the James River and Appomattox River.

References

 The National Parks: Index 2001-2003. Washington: U.S. Department of the Interior.

External links

 Official NPS website: Petersburg National Battlefield

Battlefields of the Eastern Theater of the American Civil War
Parks in Dinwiddie County, Virginia
National Battlefields and Military Parks of the United States
Parks in Prince George County, Virginia
National Register of Historic Places in Dinwiddie County, Virginia
Protected areas of Virginia
Museums in Dinwiddie County, Virginia
Hopewell, Virginia
Petersburg, Virginia
Protected areas established in 1926
American Civil War museums in Virginia
Museums in Petersburg, Virginia
Conflict sites on the National Register of Historic Places in Virginia
American Civil War on the National Register of Historic Places